Victor Amadeus III (Vittorio Amadeo Maria; 26 June 1726 – 16 October 1796) was King of Sardinia from 1773 to his death. Although he was politically conservative, he carried out numerous administrative reforms until he declared war on Revolutionary France in 1792. He was the father of the last three mainline Kings of Sardinia.

Early life and personality

Born at the Royal Palace of Turin, he was a son of Charles Emmanuel III of Sardinia and his second wife Polyxena of Hesse-Rotenburg. He was styled the Duke of Savoy from birth until he succeeded to his father's throne. He was the eldest son of his parents and was the heir apparent from birth which was greeted with much celebration. His father had had a son with his first wife, Countess Palatine Anne Christine of Sulzbach who was also named Victor Amadeus, Duke of Aosta, but died in 1725. His education was entrusted to Gerdil Giacinto Sigismondo, with a particular emphasis on military training. Throughout his life he 
would have a great interest in the state military, on which he lavished attention.

As a young prince, he surrounded himself with intellectuals and ministers, many of whom would come to prominence in his reign. He was privately conservative and a very religious person, and, as a young boy, stayed far from public life. His father felt him to be unsuitable to hold power.

Good-natured but naive, Savoy would be loved by his subjects for his generosity.

Marriage

He married Infanta Maria Antonia of Spain (1729–1785), youngest daughter of Philip V of Spain and Elisabeth Farnese. They were married on 31 May 1750 at Oulx and later had twelve children. He had a loving relationship with his wife who exerted little influence over her husband. The marriage had been arranged by Maria Antonietta's half brother, the ruling Ferdinand VI of Spain. The Spanish Infanta had been previously rejected by Louis, Dauphin of France. The union was used to strengthen relations between Madrid and Turin having fought on opposing sides in the War of the Austrian Succession. The Treaty of Aix-la-Chapelle ended the war.

King of Sardinia

When Victor Amadeus came to the throne in 1773 he started working on bureaucratic and military aspects of the reign. He was suspicious of anything innovative. However, he did implement several public works as well as paying a great deal of attention to his administration and armed forces. He approved and set up two new important cultural state institutions on the advice of the bourgeoisie and aristocracy alike. He started works of improvements in the port of Nice, and had dams in the Arce and the road of the Côte built.

At the outbreak of the French Revolution, Victor Amadeus III allowed his two sons-in-law, the Counts of Artois, Provence and the Princesses Marie Adélaïde and Victoire to stay in his kingdom under his protection. After four years of fighting, the French under Bonaparte had finally beaten the Piedmontese army in the Battle of Montenotte (12 April 1796), the Battle of Millesimo (13–14 April 1796) and the Battle of Mondovi (21 April 1796). On April 26 the French proclaimed the Republic of Alba on the occupied territories. Two days later, with the Armistice of Cherasco, the Republic was ceded back to Victor Amadeus. He was forced to sign the Treaty of Paris on May 15 abandoning the First Coalition against the French Republic.

The terms of the treaty required him to cede the fortresses of Cuneo, Ceva, Alessandria and Tortona to France, and allow free passage of the latter's armies towards Italy. He was also compelled to cede Nice and Savoy. 

He died on 16 October, 1796 at the Castle of Moncalieri having suffered an attack of apoplexy. Victor Amadeus died leaving an economically damaged kingdom and two key provinces – Savoy and Nice – devastated, having suffered at the hands of French revolutionary forces. He was buried at the Basilica of Superga in Turin.

Legacy

In 1786 Victor Amadeus III moved the remains on many of his ancestors and kinsmen to the Basilica of Superga, where he himself rests today.  He established the  Gold Medal of Military Valor 21 May 1793.  Like his parents, he carried out improvements to the Palazzina di caccia of Stupinigi outside Turin.  Victor Amadeus III also encouraged the extension of the Orto Botanico dell'Università di Torino as well as the Società Agraria di Torino, which he created in 1785.  His first cousin the Landgrave of Hesse-Rotenburg was named after him.

Issue

 Charles Emmanuel IV of Sardinia (24 May 1751 – 6 October 1819) married Princess Marie Clotilde of France in 1775, no issue.
 Maria Elisabetta Carlotta of Savoy (16 July 1752 – 17 April 1755) died in infancy.
 Maria Giuseppina of Savoy (2 September 1753 – 13 November 1810) married Louis Stanislas, Count of Provence in 1771, no issue.
 Amadeus Alexander of Savoy (5 October 1754 – 29 April 1755) died in infancy.
 Maria Teresa of Savoy (31 January 1756 – 2 June 1805) married Charles, Count of Artois in 1773, had issue.
 Maria Anna of Savoy (17 December 1757 – 11 October 1824) married Prince Benedetto of Savoy in 1775, no issue.
 Victor Emmanuel I of Sardinia (24 July 1759 – 10 January 1824) married Archduchess Maria Theresa of Austria-Este in 1789, had issue.
 Maria Cristina Ferdinanda of Savoy (21 November 1760 – 19 May 1768) died in infancy.
 Maurizio of Savoy (13 December 1762 – 1 September 1799) died unmarried of malaria.
 Maria Carolina of Savoy (17 January 1764 – 28 December 1782) married Antony, Electoral Prince of Saxony in 1781, no issue.
 Charles Felix of Sardinia (6 April 1765 – 27 April 1831) married Princess Maria Cristina of Naples and Sicily in 1807, no issue.
 Giuseppe of Savoy (5 October 1766 – 29 October 1802) died unmarried of malaria.

Ancestry

References

External links

1726 births
1796 deaths
18th-century kings of Sardinia
18th-century Dukes of Savoy
Nobility from Turin
Claimant Kings of Jerusalem
Grand Masters of the Gold Medal of Military Valor
Burials at the Basilica of Superga
Princes of Savoy